German Vietnamese or Vietnamese German may be:
Of or relating to Germany-Vietnam relations
Vietnamese people in Germany
Germans in Vietnam
Eurasian (mixed ancestry) people of German and Vietnamese descent